Guido Mazzoni may refer to:

Guido Mazzoni (sculptor) (c. 1445–1518), sculptor
Guido Mazzoni (poet) (1859–1943), poet and professor